Albert Viktor Julius Joseph Michael Graf von Mensdorff-Pouilly-Dietrichstein (5 September 1861 – 15 June 1945) was an Austro-Hungarian diplomat who served as Ambassador to London at the outbreak of World War I.

Early life 
Born in Lemberg (now Lviv) on 5 September 1861 as the second son of Alexander von Mensdorff-Pouilly, Prince von Dietrichstein zu Nikolsburg, a former Austro-Hungarian politician, and his wife Alexandrine (née Countess von Dietrichstein-Proskau und Leslie), heiress of the Princes of Dietrichstein. By birth, he was a member of Mensdorff-Pouilly family which originated from Lorraine in France and had fled the French revolution in 1790.

Career 
Count von Mensdorff-Pouilly-Dietrichstein entered the Austro-Hungarian foreign service in 1884 and was assigned as an attaché to the embassy in Paris and transferred to London in 1889. His family connections with the British court, derived through the marriage of his grandfather Count Emmanuel von Mensdorff-Pouilly with Queen Victoria's aunt, Princess Sophie of Saxe-Coburg-Saalfeld, and his father had been a godson and favorite friend of Queen Victoria's husband, the Prince Consort. On 6 May 1904, he presented his credentials as Ambassador of the Dual Monarchy at the Court of St. James's, a promotion over the heads of many of his seniors that had come at the request of his second cousin King Edward VII. 

Considered both an effective and popular diplomat in London's aristocratic circles, his friendship with King Edward VII and his successor George V gave him an entrée to the British court unrivalled by any other diplomat. This contributed to the secure and friendly diplomatic relations between Austria-Hungary and Great Britain before the war. However, his alleged Anglophilia also brought him a certain mistrust in some circles in Vienna, including Archduke Franz Ferdinand. In the critical negotiations during the July Crisis of 1914, he supported the attempts to avert the danger and correspondence has shown that he was not kept fully informed of his capital's intentions. War against Austria-Hungary was declared by the United Kingdom on 12 August, whereafter Count von Mensdorff-Pouilly-Dietrichstein left London. 

During World War I, Mensdorff-Pouilly was entrusted with several diplomatic missions directed towards the restoration of peace. The most famous one was the meeting with General Jan Smuts in Geneva in December 1917. However, these negotiations proved as fruitless as those which he conducted with the representatives of the Triple Entente in the last days of the Habsburg Monarchy. 

In 1917, Mensdorff-Pouilly was appointed to the Upper House (Herrenhaus) and in the following year he was a favourite of the court to replace Count Ottokar Czernin as foreign minister, but he was judged too Anglophile by Berlin.

Although the count retired from active service in 1919, he was appointed the first chief delegate of the Republic of Austria to the League of Nations in 1920. In this capacity, he negotiated the Geneva Protocols in 1922 on a loan for the economic and financial reconstruction of Austria. 

Count von Mensdorff-Pouilly-Dietrichstein died in Vienna on 15 June 1945.

Honours
He received the following orders and decorations:
 :
 Grand Cross of the Imperial Order of Leopold, 1908
 Commander of the Teutonic Order
 : Grand Cross of the Order of Saint Alexander
    Ernestine duchies: Grand Cross of the Saxe-Ernestine House Order
 : Grand Cross of the Order of Saint Olav, 26 February 1917
 : Order of Osmanieh, 1st Class
  Parmese Ducal Family: Senator Grand Cross of the Sacred Military Constantinian Order of Saint George
 : Knight of the Order of Saint Anna, 2nd Class
 : Honorary Knight Commander of the Royal Victorian Order, 30 June 1897; Grand Cross, 11 October 1901

Ancestry

References

External links

 
 'Mensdorff-Pouilly-Dietrichstein Albert Graf', Österreichisches Biographisches Lexikon 1815-1950
 'Albert Graf von Mensdorff-Pouilly-Dietrichstein', Solving Problems Through Force

1861 births
1945 deaths
Austro-Hungarian diplomats of World War I
Austro-Hungarian diplomats
Austrian diplomats
Counts of Austria
Diplomats from Lviv
Austrian people of French descent
Ambassadors of Austria-Hungary to the United Kingdom
Albert
Recipients of the Order of St. Anna, 2nd class
Honorary Knights Grand Cross of the Royal Victorian Order